The Waves Pt. 1 is the fifth studio album by English musician Kele Okereke. It was released on 28 May 2021 through Kola Records. Upon release, it received positive reviews from critics.

Background and recording
The Waves Pt. 1 was released on 28 May 2021 with the label KOLA Records / !K7. Pitchfork called it a "the product of lockdown recording and late-night walks through London as the stay-at-home father of two passed time posting guitar covers on Instagram."

Critical response

The Waves Pt. 1 received a score of 69/100 on review aggregator Metacritic based on eight reviews, indicating "generally favorable reviews". Marc Hogan of Pitchfork called it "as low-key and eccentric as [Kele] he's ever sounded". The Observer Damien Morris was more critical opining: "Its self-indulgence fits well with Okereke's fifth solo album. Songs of dubious quality sidle in and out, unsure how they should be listened to, or why. There are occasional pleasant interludes and codas, particularly during "From a Place of Love" and "The Patriots"." Jenessa Williams from NME labelled it "Adding interesting new textures to his playbook, it’s perhaps helpful to think of The Waves Pt.1 as a soundtrack to something bigger, the wading out to sea before the full immersive plunge".

Track listing

Personnel 
 Written and performed by Kele Okereke

References 

Kele Okereke albums
2021 albums